Tirfing is an 1895 Swedish-language opera by Wilhelm Stenhammar.

Recordings
Tirfing (Excerpts) Ingrid Tobiasson, Jesper Taube, Carina Morling Royal Opera Orchestra, Stockholm, Leif Segerstam Sterling 1CD

References

Swedish-language operas